Kaori ( "scent/aroma, fabric/weave" and occasionally rendered "perfume") is a feminine Japanese given name. Notable people with the name include:

Kaori (voice actress) (born 1976), Japanese voice actress and singer
, musician known as Bonnie Pink
Kaori Asoh (born 1967), Japanese actress and voice actress
Kaori Chiba (born 1981), field hockey player
, Go player
, author
, Japanese voice actress
Kaori Hamura, artist and illustrator
, Japanese professional wrestler
, Japanese sport wrestler
, musician and former Morning Musume member
, Japanese volleyball player
Kaori Ito (伊藤 郁女, born 1979), Japanese dancer and choreographer
Kaori Ishihara (born 1993), idol, actress, voice actress and singer
, Japanese ski jumper
, Japanese swimmer
Kaori Kato (born 1977), Japanese women cricketer
Kaori Kawamura (1971–2009), Japanese singer
Kaori Kobayashi, Japanese jazz saxophonist and flautist
, Japanese voice actress
Kaori Manabe (born 1981), Japanese television personality and model
Kaori Maruya (born 1965), member of the New Komeito Party
, Japanese judoka
, voice actress
Kaori Mizumori (born 1973), enka singer
, singer and vocalist of Every Little Thing
, actress
Kaori Mori (born 1979), badminton player
, Japanese long-distance runner
, musician and former member of The Go-Bang's and Ram Jam World
, classical guitarist
Kaori Nanao, a Japanese singer
, Japanese singer
, Japanese voice actress
Kaori Oda, a singer
, actress
, Japanese-Filipina actress
, Japanese handball player
Kaori Sakagami (born 1974), Japanese singer
Kaori Sakamoto (坂本花織, born 2000), Japanese figure skater 
Kaori Shima, singer known by the stage name Ua
, Japanese nude model, gravure idol, television personality and actress
, Japanese voice actress
, Japanese synchronized swimmer
, Japanese actress
, Japanese shogi player
Kaori Utatsuki, J-pop singer
Kaori Yamaguchi (born 1964), Japanese retired judoka
, Japanese swimmer
, Japanese professional wrestler
, manga artist

Fictional characters
 Kaori Kuromine, a.k.a. Kaolinite/Kaorinite, one of the main antagonists in the 3rd Arc/season of Bishōjo Senshi Sailor Moon Manga.  
 Kaori (Akira), Tetsuo Shima's girlfriend in the film Akira
 Kaori Izumi, a character in the manga and anime Best Student Council
 Kaori Kinjo, a minor character in the Blood+ anime
 Kaori Makimura, Ryo Saeba's love interest in the manga and anime City Hunter
 Kaori Nishidake, a character in the video game franchise SSX
 Kaori Saito, a character in the manga Jiraishin
 Kaori Sakuragi, a character in the manga and anime Strawberry Panic!
 Kaori Yanase (Variable Geo), a character in the Variable Geo video games
 Kaori Suzumeda, a manager of Fukurodani in Haikyū!!
 Kaori, a character in the manga and anime series Azumanga Daioh
 Kaori Kanzaki, a character from the visual novel and franchise A Certain Magical Index
 Kaori Miyazono, a main character from the manga and anime series Your Lie in April
 Kaori Minami, a character in Battle Royale
 Kaori Tanaka, a supporting character in Shiki
 Kaori Rokumeikan, a character in Choujin Sentai Jetman
 Kaori Hasegawa, a character in Corpse Party
 Kaori Itami, a character in ACE Academy
 Kaori Itami, a character in ACE Academy
 Kaori, Rin Hojo's arranged fiance in the manga and anime series Initial D
 Kaori Shirasaki: character from Arifureta from commonplace to world's strongest

See also
Kaoru (disambiguation)
Agathis, also known as Kauri, an evergreen genus

References

Japanese feminine given names